Sven Schimmel (born July 30, 1989) is a German footballer who plays as a defender. He began his career with VfB Stuttgart, and made his debut for the reserve team in October 2008, as a substitute for Johannes Rahn in a 3. Liga match against Fortuna Düsseldorf. He made 46 appearances for VfB Stuttgart II before joining SV Wehen Wiesbaden in 2011.

External links
 
 

1989 births
Living people
German footballers
Association football defenders
3. Liga players
VfB Stuttgart II players
SV Wehen Wiesbaden players
SSV Reutlingen 05 players
People from Reutlingen
Sportspeople from Tübingen (region)
Footballers from Baden-Württemberg